The  (Kokusai Army Type 4 Special Transport Glider) was a Japanese military glider used during the Second World War.

Design and development
Design of the Ku-8-II began in December 1941, the glider was essentially a Kokusai Ki-59, with the engines and fuel tanks removed and a modified undercarriage. It was given the Allied code name Goose and later Gander.  The prototype was completed on May 20, 1943, and took to the air two days later, on May 22, 1943. 

A Ku-8-II version that was produced in 1944 used a tubular steel frame structure, and had a hinged nose that could be opened to the side to allow loading. Also, its capacity was increased slightly to carry twenty troops. In total, approximately 700 were built. They were used operationally in the Philippines, primarily to carry supplies.

Variants
Ku-8-I:Prototypes.
Ku-8-II:Military transport glider. Production version.

Operators

 Imperial Japanese Army

Specifications

See also

References

External links

 

Ku-08, Kokusai
1940s military gliders
World War II Japanese transport aircraft
Ku-08
High-wing aircraft
Aircraft first flown in 1943